The 2021 Iowa Hawkeyes football team represented the University of Iowa during the 2021 NCAA Division I FBS football season. The Hawkeyes played their home games at Kinnick Stadium in Iowa City, Iowa, and competed in the West Division of the Big Ten Conference. They were led by 23rd-year head coach Kirk Ferentz.

With a victory over rival Nebraska on November 26 coupled with a Wisconsin loss to Minnesota the following day, Iowa won its first Big Ten West title since 2015. They competed in the Big Ten Championship Game against East Division co-champion Michigan, where they lost by a 39 point margin. Iowa capped the 2021 season with a frustrating 20–17 loss to No. 22 Kentucky in the Citrus Bowl. The Hawkeyes finished with a record of 10–4 (7–2 B1G), the seventh season with 10+ wins in the Ferentz era.

Junior center Tyler Linderbaum was named Big Ten Offensive Lineman of the Year, unanimous First-team All-American, and was awarded the Rimington Trophy. He later became the 11th Iowa player of the Ferentz era taken in the first round of the NFL Draft.

Previous season
After scheduled games against Northern Iowa, Iowa State, and Northern Illinois were canceled due to the Big Ten Conference's decision to play a conference-only schedule, the 2020 Hawkeyes team finished with a 6–2 record to finish in second place in the West Division. They received an invitation to the Music City Bowl with a matchup with Missouri, but the game was cancelled due to a COVID-19 outbreak within the Tigers' football program.

Schedule

Roster

Rankings

Game summaries

No. 17 Indiana

Source: Box Score

Iowa jumped out to an early lead and never looked back. The Hawkeyes defense came out in full force, getting three interceptions – including two pick sixes by senior Riley Moss – and kept Indiana out of the end zone. Equally impressive for an opening game, Iowa limited itself to a mere two penalties.

at No. 9 Iowa State

Source: Box Score

This season’s Cy-Hawk matchup was a showdown of top 10 teams in the AP poll, making this the first time the schools have faced off as ranked opponents. ESPN's College GameDay was on hand for the second straight time in the series as the annual contest was cancelled the previous year due to COVID-19. Iowa extended its win streak in the series to six games, and has now won five consecutive games against ranked opponents – its longest such streak since 1960.

Kent State

Source: Box Score

The Hawkeyes, playing as an AP top 5 team at home for the first time since 1985, won for the 300th time at Kinnick Stadium since its opening in 1929. Tyler Goodson had his best game to date, rushing for 153 yards. This was the first meeting of the programs since 2004.

Colorado State

Source: Box Score

This was the first meeting between the two schools. After a sluggish start, the Hawkeyes shut out Colorado State in the second half to extend its streak of holding opponents under 25 points.

at Maryland

Source: Box Score

In the first match-up of the teams since 2018, Iowa tied the school record with six interceptions in this lopsided road win. It is the first 5–0 start for the program since 2015. The Hawkeyes also scored the most points in a quarter since 2002.

No. 4 Penn State

Source: Box Score

Iowa was seeking its first home win over Penn State since 2010 with Fox's Big Noon Kickoff on hand. This match-up of top five teams in the AP poll was the first such game at Kinnick Stadium since No. 2 Michigan visited the No. 1 Hawkeyes in 1985. Iowa fell behind 17–3 to PSU, but after an injury to Nittany Lions quarterback Sean Clifford, the Hawkeyes slowly clawed back, outscoring Penn State 20–3 the rest of the way to earn the 23–20 win. With this victory, Iowa improved to 6–0, became bowl eligible, extended their overall win streak to 12 games, and ascended to No. 2 in both major polls the following day.

Purdue

Source: Box Score

The unranked Boilermakers dominated this matchup with the Hawkeyes, and won for the fourth time in the last five meetings with Iowa.

at Wisconsin

Source: Box Score

The unranked Badgers dominated this matchup with the Hawkeyes, and became the first Iowa opponent to score more than 24 points since the 2018 regular season finale.

at Northwestern

Source: Box Score

Backup quarterback Alex Padilla led two first-half touchdown drives, and the Iowa defense forced three interceptions as the Hawkeyes snapped a two-game skid.

Minnesota

Source: Box Score

In Alex Padilla’s first start at quarterback, Iowa won for the seventh straight time in this trophy series. Padilla threw for two touchdowns and ran for another in the victory. The Golden Gophers haven't won at Kinnick Stadium since 1999.

Illinois

Source: Box Score

Iowa won for the eighth straight time in the series. Illinois hasn't won at Kinnick Stadium since 1999.

at Nebraska

Source: Box Score

After facing a 21–6 third quarter deficit, the Hawkeyes rallied to earn a win over the Cornhuskers as they outscored the home team 22–0 to end the game. It was Iowa’s fifth straight victory in Lincoln and seventh straight victory overall in this trophy series.

vs. No. 2 Michigan (Big Ten Championship Game)

Source: Box Score

This game marked Iowa’s second appearance in the Big Ten Championship Game (2015). Ferentz is now 1–2 against Michigan in the Harbaugh era.

vs. No. 22 Kentucky (Citrus Bowl)

Source: Box Score

The Wildcats and Hawkeyes faced off for the first time, and Iowa returned to the Citrus Bowl for the first time since the 2005 Capital One Bowl. The loss kept the Hawkeyes from winning four consecutive bowl games for the first time in program history.

Awards and honors

Players drafted into the NFL

References

Iowa
Iowa Hawkeyes football seasons
Iowa Hawkeyes football